The  is a DC electric multiple unit (EMU) commuter train type operated by the private railway operator Tobu Railway in Japan since 1963. A total of 712 vehicles were built between 1963 and 1983, making this the most numerous EMU type operated by any private railway operator in Japan.

Operations

Isesaki Line
The Isesaki Line fleet based at Tatebayashi Depot consists of two-car trainsets. This fleet includes three-car 800 and 850 series trains converted from 8000 series units, which are also based at Tatebayashi Depot.

Kameido Line, Daishi Line

The Kameido Line and Daishi Line fleet based at Kasukabe Depot consists of two-car trainsets modified for driver-only operation.

Sano Line
Tobu Sano Line services are operated by 800 and 850 series three-car driver-only-operation sets introduced from the start of the revised timetable on 18 March 2006.

Kiryu Line, Koizumi Line
The Kiryu Line and Koizumi Line fleet based at Tatebayashi Depot consists of two-car trainsets modified for driver-only operation.

Utsunomiya Line
The Utsunomiya Line fleet based at Shin-Tochigi Depot consists of four-car trainsets modified for driver-only operation.

Urban Park Line
The Urban Park Line fleet based at Nanakōdai Depot consists of six-car trainsets.

Tojo Line

The Tōjō Line fleet based at Shinrinkōen Depot consists of 11 four-car trainsets. These are used in local driver-only operation services north of Ogawamachi, where four sets are required every day.

Ogose Line

From the start of the revised timetable on 14 June 2008, only refurbished four-car driver-only-operation sets are used on the Tobu Ogose Line.

History

Production
The first 8000 series appeared in November 1963 as four-car sets. These were joined from December 1964 by two-car sets (formed MoHa8500 + KuHa8600). Between 1971 and 1972, 14 pairs of additional intermediate cars (SaHa8700 + MoHa8800) were built and inserted into four-car sets 8101 to 8114 to lengthen them to six cars. 8000 series trains built up to this point were not equipped with air-conditioning, but from June 1972, three 6-car air-conditioned sets (8156 to 8158) were delivered. The originally non-fitted sets were also modified with air-conditioning from October 1973 until 1983 at the Alna Kōki (now Alna Sharyō) factory in Osaka and Tsuha Sharyō factory in Nishiarai, Tokyo.

In May 1977, the first eight-car 8000 series set (8173) was delivered for use on the Tojo Line.

October 1979 saw the last two digits of individual car running numbers exceed 99, resulting in some cars receiving five-digit (8xxxx) running numbers.

The last two sets built, 81120 and 8580, were delivered in 1983.

The fleet changes between 1963, when the first sets were built, and 1983, when construction ended, are shown below.

The fleet changes from 2005, when withdrawals commenced, are shown below. (Including 800/850 series 3-car sets)

Refurbishment

Life-extension refurbishment began in 1986, and sets treated from 1987 received redesigned cab ends based on the 6050 series design. Sets refurbished from 1997 onward received HID headlights and LED external destination indicators, replacing the original roller blind type.

2001 saw the first appearance of two-car sets modified for driver-only-operation. This included the addition of an automated bilingual (Japanese and English) passenger announcement system, internal LED passenger information displays, and external speakers.

Some of the remaining unrefurbished sets also received LED destination indicators.

800 and 850 series conversion

From 2004, five eight-car sets were reformed to create pairs of three-car 800 and 850 series driver-only-operation sets for use on Sano and Kiryu Line services. This conversion involved adding new cabs to former MoHa8300 and MoHa8200 intermediate cars.

The new sets are formed as follows.

800 series
 KuHa800-1
 MoHa800-2 (with two pantographs)
 MoHa800-3

850 series
 MoHa850-1 (with two pantographs)
 MoHa850-2
 KuHa850-3

Livery changes

When first built, the 8000 series sets were finished in a livery of "royal beige" and "international orange". From May 1974, sets were repainted into a simpler all-over livery of "sage cream". From 1985, sets were repainted into a new livery of "jasmine white" with dark and light blue bodyside stripes.

Commemorative liveries
One six-car set, 8108, was repainted into the original beige and orange livery between October 2004 and June 2005 to mark the 90th anniversary of the Tojo Line. This unit was subsequently returned to standard livery following overhaul in July 2005.

In August 2012, six-car set 8111, preserved in running order by the Tobu Museum, was repainted into its original "royal beige" and "international orange" livery for a series of special event runs.

In March 2014, to mark the 100th anniversary of the opening of the Tobu Tojo Line, four-car set 81111, based at Shinrinkoen Depot, was repainted into the all-over "sage cream" livery carried by sets from the 1970s.

In November 2014, four-car set 81107, based at Shinrinkoen Depot, was repainted into the original "royal beige" and "international orange" livery.

From 28 November 2015, four-car set 8198, based at Shinrinkoen Depot, was repainted into the dark blue with yellow stripe livery carried by 54 series and 53 series EMUs used on Flying Tojo limited express services on the Tobu Tojo Line during the 1950s.

From 23 March 2016, two-car set 8577, used on the Tobu Kameido Line and Tobu Daishi Line, received the "international orange" and "medium yellow" livery carried by 7300 and 7800 series trains between 1958 and 1964.

Preserved six-car set 8111 was repainted from its "royal beige" and "international orange" livery into all-over "sage cream" livery in August 2016.

From 16 February 2017, two-car set 8568, used on the Tobu Kameido Line and Tobu Daishi Line, received the green and "jasmine white" livery carried experimentally by one 7860 series train in the 1950s.

From 13 July 2017, two-car set 8575, used on the Tobu Kameido Line and Tobu Daishi Line, received the yellow and orange livery carried experimentally by a 7800 series train in the 1950s.

References

Further reading

External links

 Tobu 8000 series 

Electric multiple units of Japan
8000 series
Train-related introductions in 1963
Nippon Sharyo multiple units
1500 V DC multiple units of Japan
Alna Koki rolling stock
Kisha Seizo multiple units
Tokyu Car multiple units
Fuji rolling stock